The Parish of Yarara is a civil parish of Cowley County, New South Wales. The parish is between the Murrumbidgee River and the Australian Capital Territory border and is heavily forested. It lies to the west of Michelago, but is cut off from it by the Murrumbidgee and is only accessible by road from Tharwa or Williamsdale.

References

Parishes of Cowley County